José Palmeira Lessa (January 18, 1942) is a prelate of the Roman Catholic Church. He served as auxiliary bishop of São Sebastião do Rio de Janeiro from 1982 till 1987, when he became bishop of Propriá. In 1996 he became coadjutor archbishop of Aracajú, succeeding as archbishop in 1998.

Life 
Born in Coruripe, Palmeira Lessa was ordained to the priesthood on July 3, 1968.

On June 21, 1982, he was appointed auxiliary bishop of São Sebastião do Rio de Janeiro and titular bishop of Sita. Palmeira Lessa received his episcopal consecration on the following August 24 from Eugênio Cardinal de Araújo Sales, archbishop of São Sebastião do Rio de Janeiro, with the bishop of Guaxupé, José Alberto Lopes de Castro Pinto, and the bishop of Vitória da Conquista, Celso José Pinto da Silva, serving as co-consecrators.

On October 30, 1987, he was appointed bishop of Propriá. He served in this position for nine years, before being appointed coadjutor archbishop of Aracajú on December 6, 1996, succeeding as archbishop on August 26, 1998 after the retirement of his predecessor Luciano José Cabral Duarte.

References

External links 
 Entry about José Palmeira Lessa at catholic-hierarchy.org 

1942 births
20th-century Roman Catholic bishops in Brazil
21st-century Roman Catholic archbishops in Brazil
Living people
Roman Catholic archbishops of Aracaju
Roman Catholic bishops of São Sebastião do Rio de Janeiro
Roman Catholic bishops of Propriá